The Lime Kiln Valley AVA is an American Viticultural Area located in the larger Cienega Valley AVA in San Benito County, California. This appellation spans  and was granted AVA status in 1982. The soil in the region is composed of foundations of limestone and dolomite with sandy, gravelly loam above. The AVA is home to old vines' Mourvedre plantings.

Enz Vineyard and Gros Verdot
The only vineyards in the Lime Kiln Valley AVA are owned by the Enz Family. Currently there are 40 acres of vineyards, including a 15-acre parcel of head-trained Mourvedre that was originally planted in 1922.

In 2007, the Enz Vineyard first planted in 1895 and now growing grapes for Kenneth Volk Vineyards was discovered to be planted with the nearly extinct Bordeaux variety Gros Verdot instead of Cabernet Pfeffer as originally thought.

References

American Viticultural Areas
American Viticultural Areas of California
Geography of San Benito County, California
Lime kilns in the United States
1982 establishments in California